JVIS is an automotive electronics and accessories supplier based in Michigan.

Open Dots
 
Open Dots is a conductive charging specification that was promoted by the Open Dots Alliance, a 501(c)(6) non-profit organization, which was formed by JVIS in 2015 and appears to be inactive since 2018. The technology has been available since 2009 in various JVIS products.

An Open Dots receiver, which can be a phone case, has three contacts arranged 120 degrees apart on the circumference of a circle of one-centimeter (two-fifths of an inch) radius, and a fourth contact at its center. An Open Dots charger, typically a charging pad, is a surface with a grid of approximately centimeter-wide contacts, spaced apart so an individual receiver contact cannot touch two pad contacts simultaneously. Two adjacent rows of pad contacts have opposite polarities. When the surface of the receiver is placed on the surface an Open Dots charging pad, the contacts can form an electrical circuit in any angular orientation, allowing the user to simply place their device on a charging pad and start charging.

In May 2015, the alliance stated that the Open Dots standard was adapted for use in 12 vehicle models across five major automotive brands – Ford, Chrysler, RAM, Dodge, and Scion. Phone case maker Incipio was mentioned as making compatible products.

References 

Mobile telecommunications user equipment